Rokszyce may refer to the following places:
Rokszyce, Piotrków County in Łódź Voivodeship (central Poland)
Rokszyce, Rawa County in Łódź Voivodeship (central Poland)
Rokszyce, Subcarpathian Voivodeship (south-east Poland)